Matteo Casserino was an Italian American mandolinist and composer.

Born in the province of Ragusa in 1913, he worked for several years in the Italian Merchant Marine before emigrating to the United States in 1936, settling in New York City at age 23. He moved to San Francisco with his wife Viola in 1943 and found work as a cabinet maker and joined the Carpenter's Union. After retiring in 1973, he focused on his musical pursuits as a mandolinist and played weekly at the Caffe Trieste in the North Beach neighborhood. He moved to San Rafael, CA in 1990.

Further reading
Mignano Crawford, Sheri. Mandolins, Like Salami. Zighi Baci Publishing: Petaluma, CA, 2005.

External links
Matteo Casserino discography at Discogs
Matteo Casserino credits at IMDb

References

Musicians from the San Francisco Bay Area
American mandolinists
1913 births
2001 deaths
Musicians from the Province of Ragusa
Italian emigrants to the United States